= Alush Mërhori =

Albanian footballer

Alush Mërhori (23 February 1923 - 13 January 2011) was an Albanian footballer who played most of his professional career as forward for Besa Kavajë football club. He went on to compete with the club for 17 full seasons before joining the newly formed Partizani Tirana. Mërhori scored the only goal of the match in the 1949 Albanian Cup final against Tirana. He won 3 league and cup titles as a player for Partizani.
